Hoshiarpur Lok Sabha constituency is one of the 13 Lok Sabha (parliamentary) constituencies in Punjab state in northern India.

Assembly segments
Hoshiarpur Lok Sabha constituency comprises the following nine Vidhan Sabha (Legislative Assembly) segments:

Members of Parliament

Election results

General elections, 2019

2014 results

2009 results

See also
 Hoshiarpur district
 List of Constituencies of the Lok Sabha

Notes

External links
Hoshiarpur lok sabha  constituency election 2019 result details

Lok Sabha constituencies in Punjab, India
Hoshiarpur district